Terlago (Terlác in local dialect) was a comune (municipality) in Trentino in the northern Italian region Trentino-Alto Adige/Südtirol, located about  northwest of Trento. It was merged with Padergnone and Vezzano on January 1, 2016, to form a new municipality, Vallelaghi.

Terlago borders the following municipalities: Fai della Paganella, Molveno, Lavis, Zambana, Andalo, Trento and Vezzano.

Terlago's name derives from the Latin trilacum -- "the three lakes"—which refers to nearby Lake Lamar, Lake Terlago, and Lago Santo.

Demographic evolution

References

External links
 Homepage of the city

Cities and towns in Trentino-Alto Adige/Südtirol